{{DISPLAYTITLE:C14H16N2O}}
The molecular formula C14H16N2O (molar mass: 228.29 g/mol, exact mass: 228.1263 u) may refer to:

 PHA-57378
 RU-24,969

Molecular formulas